Redcliffe Hall may refer to 

 Redcliffe Hall, Bristol
 Redcliffe Hall, a former church hall in Redcliffe, Western Australia

See also
 Radcliff Hall (disambiguation)

Architectural disambiguation pages